The men's freestyle 125 kg is a competition featured at the 2016 Russian National Freestyle Wrestling Championships, and was held in Yakutsk, Russia on May 28.

Medalists

Results
Legend
F — Won by fall
WO — Won by walkover

Finals

Top half

Bottom half

Repechage

References
http://vk.com/doc9602940_437540078?hash=bf2f02c644462f375e&dl=18efe2a1e52222e74a

Men's freestyle 125 kg